Richard Dennis William Miller (born 14 February 1929) is a British athlete. He competed in the men's javelin throw at the 1952 Summer Olympics.

References 

1929 births
Living people
Athletes (track and field) at the 1952 Summer Olympics
Athletes (track and field) at the 1958 British Empire and Commonwealth Games
British male javelin throwers
Javelin throwers from Northern Ireland
Olympic athletes of Great Britain
Sportspeople from Reading, Berkshire
Commonwealth Games competitors for Northern Ireland